The Liberal People's Party (DLF) was a social liberal political party in Norway, established by a split in the Liberal Party over the issue of Norway's accession to the European Economic Community in 1972. The party was originally called the New People's Party until changing its name in 1980.

History
The new party, formed by the pro-EEC minority of the Liberal Party, originally wanted to call itself the "Popular Party - New Liberals" (Folkepartiet Nye Venstre), but was denied the use of this name, as it was deemed too similar to the Liberal Party, which in Norway is called "Venstre" (literally "Left"). Instead, the party called itself the New People's Party (Det Nye Folkepartiet). The name was in 1980 changed to the Liberal People's Party.

At the time of the split, eight of the thirteen Liberal Party MPs joined the new party. At the 1973 parliamentary election, the Liberal People's Party however won merely one seat, from Hordaland (the Liberal Party won two seats). At the next election, in 1977, the Liberal People's Party lost this seat, and was never represented in Parliament again. The party's popularity declined throughout the 1980s. In the local elections in 1987 the two parties ran on common lists in several counties and municipalities. In 1988, it was decided to officially merge back together with the Liberal Party.

In 1992, some of the old members decided to recreate DLF, reviving the Liberal People's Party name. However, the new party was later taken over by a group of free-market libertarians and former members of the Progress Party.

Party leaders
1972–1973 Helge Seip
1973–1978 Magne Lerheim
1978–1980 Ingvar Lars Helle
1980–1982 Gerd Søraa
1982–1986 Øyvind Bjorvatn
1986–1988 Alice Ruud
1988 Marit Bjorvatn

See also
Liberalism
Contributions to liberal theory
Liberalism worldwide
List of liberal parties
Liberal democracy
Liberalism in Norway

References

 
Social liberal parties
Norway 1972
Defunct political parties in Norway
Political parties established in 1972
Political parties disestablished in 1988